Arbayta (Arbaytı) is a rural locality (a selo) in Shebalinsky District, the Altai Republic, Russia. The population was 40 as of 2016. There are 8 streets.

Geography 
Arbayta is located 16 km northwest of Shebalino (the district's administrative centre) by road. Dyektiyek is the nearest rural locality.

References 

Rural localities in Shebalinsky District